Baliosus is a genus of tortoise beetles and hispines in the family Chrysomelidae. There are at least 40 described species in Baliosus.

Species

References

Further reading

 
 
 
 

Cassidinae